St. Ann Parish is a Roman Catholic church in Bridgeport, Connecticut, part of the  Diocese of Bridgeport.

History 
Located in the historic Black Rock section of Bridgeport, this church dates from the 1940s and was designed by noted architect J. Gerald Phelan who designed the main campus of Fairfield University along with many other churches, schools, convents and rectories for Catholic clients in Connecticut and elsewhere.

References

External links 
 St. Ann - Diocesan information 
 St. Ann - Website
 Diocese of Bridgeport

20th-century Roman Catholic church buildings in the United States
Ann
Roman Catholic Diocese of Bridgeport